Commerson's frogfish or the giant frogfish, Antennarius commerson, is a  marine fish belonging to the family Antennariidae.

Description
Like other members of its family, it has a globular, extensible body. The soft skin is covered with small dermal spinules. Its skin is partially covered with a few small, wartlike protuberances, some variably shaped, scab-like blotches, and a few, small eye spots (ocelli) reminiscent of the holes in sponges. Its large mouth is prognathous, allowing it to consume prey as large as itself. Their coloration is extremely variable, as they tend to match their environments.
Frogfish can change their coloration in a few weeks. However, the dominant coloration goes from grey to black, passing through a whole range of related hues, such as cream, pink, yellow, red, and brown, and also usually with circular eye spots or blotches that are darker than the background.
Juvenile specimens can easily be confused with related Antennarius maculatus and Antennarius pictus.
To distinguish these species, A. maculatus usually has red or orange margins on all fins, while A. maculatus has numerous warts on the skin, and A. pictus is covered with ocelli. A. pictus has three eye spots on its caudal fin.

The first dorsal spine, the illicium, is modified for use as a fishing rod. Its extremity is endowed with a characteristic  esca (lure), which resembles a small fish or shrimp with a pinkish to brownish coloration. The illicium is twice the length of the second dorsal spine and is often darkly banded. The second dorsal spine is practically straight and is mobile, the third one is bent towards the back of the body, and both are membranously attached to the head. They are well separated from each other and also from the dorsal fin.

The pectoral fins are angled, and the pelvic fins help the frogfish move on the bottom and keep a stable position for ambush.

Distribution and habitat
Antennarius commerson lives in the tropical and subtropical waters from the Indian Ocean to the eastern coasts of the Pacific Ocean. It is found in lagoons and sheltered rocky and coral reefs.

Feeding and behavior
As all frogfishes, A. hispidus is a voracious carnivore which attacks any small animals that pass within range, mainly other fish, but sometimes even congeners. Commerson's frogfish has a benthic and solitary lifestyle. They gather during the mating period, but do not tolerate each other any more after the act of fertilization. The female can kill or eat the male if he stays close. It uses a small tuft of flattened appendage as a fishing lure.

References

External links
 
 Frogfish.ch
 Fishbase.org
 MarineSpecies.org
 Cornu.free.fr
 

Antennariidae
Fish of Hawaii
Taxa named by Bernard Germain de Lacépède
Fish described in 1798